Canoe Island is a 47-acre island located in the center of the San Juan Islands, an archipelago in the Northwest region of Washington State. Situated within the Upright Channel, Canoe Island lies between Shaw and Lopez Islands. The Island's maximum elevation is 127.7 feet and its surface is mostly forested with second-growth cedar, fir, hemlock, and madrona. The island also has some old-growth trees. The rocky shoreline of Canoe Island is bordered by dense forests of bull kelp.

Canoe Island is only accessible by boat, though several Washington State Ferry Routes pass between the Southern tip of the island and Flat Point on Lopez Island. Canoe Island is privately owned by Canoe Island French Camp, a 501(c)(3) nonprofit that runs an overnight summer camp for children.

History

Indigenous Presence 
Prior to European settlement, Canoe Island may have been occupied or visited by Indigenous Coast Salish peoples. Specifically, Canoe Island may have been part of the territory of the Lhaq'temish (Lummi), Tulalip, S'Klallam, and Samish Nations. The Samish name for the island is Skwsá7 snéxwlh. The island has several shell middens from this era.

Early European Exploration 
The name Canoe Island first appears on the British Admiralty Chart 2840, Richards, 1858–1860. Additional surveys by Captain George Henry in the 1850s and 1860s describe the channel surrounding Canoe Island as a safe passage with mild tides.

Military Reserve 
In 1872, the San Juan Islands were declared property of the U.S. following the Pig War. Shortly thereafter, the U.S. government sent a team of Army Engineers under the command of General Nathaniel Michler to determine the most favorable sites for military fortifications within the San Juan Islands. By September 1874, Michler and his team had selected the locations of seven large government military reservations, one of which was located on Canoe Island. The other reserves were located on San Juan, Lopez, and Shaw Islands.

In 1902, the San Juan Islander critiqued this use of land for military purposes, arguing that less than 1/10th of the land in military reserves would ever be needed by the U.S. government. It's unclear exactly why these reserves were so large, though it's possible that the government overestimated the value of the islands for military defense. The San Juan Islander also reported that the military reserves presented a barrier to settlement in the county.

During this era, individuals could obtain leases of the military reservations in the archipelago. In 1898, I. J. Lichtenberg obtained the lease of Canoe Island for $1, with the stipulation that he be prepared to leave the reserve at any time the government deemed it necessary for military operations. Lichtenberg also held the lease for the military reservation on the North end of Lopez Island.

Ultimately, the military reserves in the San Juan Islands were never used; artillery was never mounted on the sites, no military buildings were constructed, nor were troops ever housed on the reserves.

1913 Manhunt 
In 1913, Canoe Island briefly became the location of a manhunt that involved a criminal chase across multiple islands.

The search began on Orcas, where two men arrived by skiff before boarding a ship for Bellingham. When their boat was found adrift, a search turned up a pocketbook with several documents related to bank robberies and other crimes committed in Canada. The sheriff and deputy summoned the British authorities, who confirmed that the two men were wanted for several crimes.

A few days later, one of the men returned to Orcas Island seeking his pocketbook on the boat. The sheriff was notified of man's return and a shootout on the porch of the Orcas Hotel ensued. The criminal escaped to the woods and later that night he escaped unharmed from an additional exchange of shots.

The following morning, the criminal, under the disguise of a carefree fisherman, stole a boat and departed for Shaw Island. The man ate breakfast there before stealing another boat to escape Shaw. This boat was later found on Canoe Island, though the outlaw was nowhere to be found.

In the following days, rumors spread that the man was eating his meals on Shaw. The authorities failed to capture the man despite a $1500 reward, though his camp on Shaw was found and it contained bloody bandages. The sheriff and Canadian authorities eventually gave up after a two-week search, believing that the man was still hiding on Shaw and receiving help from local residents.

French Camp
In 1965, Dr. Warren and Florence Heath “Bunny” Horton Austin purchased Canoe Island for $95,000. Bunny Austin was the daughter of Horace E. Horton, founder of the Chicago Bridge & Iron Company. Three years after purchasing the island, the Austins established the “Institut Francile” and Canoe Island Camps, Inc. with help from Le Lycée Francais de Los Angeles. At first, the camp operated on Orcas Island at the Madrona Inn in Eastsound.The Austins chose to establish a French camp because no other French camp existed on the West coast at the time, and they sought to create one for their daughter, Dorothy Austin. Dr. Austin held a deep appreciation for French language and culture that sparked when he was a child. He also served in France with General Patton's Third Army in the 49th Field Hospital during World War II.

The Austins continued to hold the camp on Orcas while developing buildings and infrastructure on Canoe Island. Architect Paul Gray of California oversaw the building plans. When the buildings were completed in 1975, all camp operations moved to Canoe Island.
In 1992, Dr. Austin established the camp as a 501(c)(3) non-profit and renamed the organization Canoe Island French Camp. This change also established a board of directors, who continue to run the camp today in conjunction with the camp directors.

Canoe Island French Camp 
Currently, the camp welcomes 200 children each summer and additionally hosts school and family programs. Programming emphasizes French language and culture, as well as outdoor education. French language classes are offered, and campers participate in other activities including art, archery, fencing, kayaking, and theater. The curriculum promotes youth development, intercultural understanding, and environmental stewardship. Canoe Island French Camp seeks to give campers the tools they need to lead meaningful and successful lives resulting in positive impacts on their communities and the world.

Canoe Island French Camp is one of four overnight camps for children in the San Juan Islands; the others include YMCA Camp Orkila, Camp Nor’Wester, and Camp Four Winds Westward Ho. Canoe Island French Camp is accredited by the American Camp Association and is a member of the Western Association of Independent Camps, which means that it meets the highest standards of camp excellence.

In fiction 
Canoe Island is a locale in the novel, The Boy Book: A Study of Habits and Behaviors, Plus Techniques for Taming Them. The fictional story follows a teenager growing of age using life experiences, including those drawn from a visit to Canoe Island.

Notes

External links 

 Canoe Island French Camp
 Aerial Views of Canoe Island
Official Guide to the San Juan Islands

San Juan Islands
Summer camps